Józef Noji (8 September 1909 – 15 February 1943) was a Polish long-distance runner.

Noji was one of the best long-distance runners of the Second Polish Republic. At the 1936 Olympics, he finished fifth in the 5000 meter and 14th in the 10000 m events. He also placed fifth over 5000 m at the 1938 European Championships.

Noji was a multiple champion of Poland in the 5000, 10000 and cross country running. In 1936 he won the English title in the 6-mile run, and two years later he won the same title in the 3-mile run.  He was twice elected to the List of 10 Best Athletes of Poland; in 1936 he was second, in 1937 – tenth.

Noji did not fight in the Polish September Campaign, but as early as late 1939 or early 1940, he joined the resistance movement. He was arrested by the Germans on 18 September 1940. After one year of imprisonment at Warsaw's notorious Pawiak prison, he was transported to Auschwitz. Noji was murdered on 15 February 1943, allegedly for trying to smuggle a letter. According to witnesses, he was killed by one of the SS guards (either Palitsch, Schopp or Stiwitz).

Noji was posthumously awarded the Cross of Valor. There is a street Nojego in Auschwitz named for him, and a municipal stadium Nojiego Cross near Pęckowo.

References

Further reading

  Ryszard Wryk, Sport olimpijski w Polsce 1919–1939, Poznań 2006
  Andrzej Jucewicz, Wlodzimierz Stepinski "Chwala Olimpijczykom", Warszaw 1968 wyd sport i turystyka

1909 births
1943 deaths
People from Czarnków-Trzcianka County
Polish people who died in Auschwitz concentration camp
Athletes (track and field) at the 1936 Summer Olympics
Polish male long-distance runners
Olympic athletes of Poland
Polish resistance members of World War II
Resistance members who died in Nazi concentration camps
Polish civilians killed in World War II
Sportspeople from Greater Poland Voivodeship
Legia Warsaw athletes
Polish people executed in Nazi concentration camps
Members of the Polish Gymnastic Society "Sokół"